Alyaksandr Katlyaraw (born 30 January 1993) is a Belarusian professional footballer who plays for Krumkachy Minsk.

References

External links
 
 Profile at Gomel website
 

1993 births
Living people
Belarusian footballers
Belarusian expatriate footballers
Expatriate footballers in Latvia
Association football midfielders
FC Gomel players
FC Rechitsa-2014 players
FC Slavia Mozyr players
FC Torpedo-BelAZ Zhodino players
FK Jelgava players
FC Krumkachy Minsk players